Eugoa grisea is a moth of the family Erebidae first described by Arthur Gardiner Butler in 1877. It is found in Japan and China.

References

grisea
Moths described in 1877